Echidna xanthospilos is a moray eel found in the western central Pacific Ocean, around Indonesia and Papua New Guinea. It was first named by Pieter Bleeker in 1859. Its common names include yellow-spotted moray and skeletor moray.

References

Fish described in 1859
Taxa named by Pieter Bleeker
xanthospilos